Torney is an English, Northern-Irish and German surname which is most prevalent in Australia and has its highest density in the North of Ireland. 

As a habitational surname it may be connected to French locations with the name Tournay or Tournai (from Proto-Celtic turno- "height" with the Gaulish toponymic suffix -acu(m), meaning "location of the hills" or "shore heights") – and carried by people arriving after the Norman conquest in 1066 – or to a variety of British places named Thorney (with the Old English meaning of "thorn tree island"). As an Irish name it is the reduced Anglicized form of Ó Torna (meaning "descendant of Torna", a personal name). In Slavic influenced eastern Germany it is a toponymic surname – derived similarly as in England from the word thorn – and probably referred to a location characterized by thorn bushes and/or trees.

Notable people with the name Torney include:

George H. Torney (1850–1913), physician in the United States Navy and Army
Henry Torney (1884–1942), American football player and industrial engineer
Hugh Torney (Irish republican) (1954–1996), Irish National Liberation Army (INLA) paramilitary leader
Hugh Torney (footballer) (1909–2000), Australian rules footballer
Jason Torney (born 1977), retired Australian rules footballer
Kate Torney (born 19??), Australian journalist
Rhona Torney (born 19??), Irish camogie player
Thomas Torney (1915–1998), British Labour Party politician
Viktor von Strauß und Torney (1809–1899), German princely minister and poet

References

Anglicised Irish-language surnames
German-language surnames
English-language surnames